Nothobranchius robustus, the red Victoria nothobranch, is a species of killifish in the family) Nothobranchiidae. It is found in the Lake Victoria basin, the Lake Albert basin, the Sio River and near Ahero in Kenya, Tanzania, and Uganda. Its natural habitats are rivers, intermittent rivers, swamps, and intermittent freshwater marshes. This species was described in 1935 by Ernst Ahl from types collected in northwestern Tanzania.

References

robustus
Fish described in 1935
Taxonomy articles created by Polbot